Mandiraja Terminal is one of the bus terminals located in Banjarnegara Regency, Indonesia. this terminal serves short distance intermediate (inter city within province), and far (Inter city between provinces).

References

Buildings and structures in Central Java
Transport in Central Java